Pilbara newspapers is a selection of newspapers published in the Pilbara region of Western Australia.
 
The rise and fall of some of the newspapers reflect the shifts and changes in population in various localities of the region as mining starts and moves through different zones, and also as some mining operations are exhausted or closed.

Titles

Earlier newspapers

Pilbarra Goldfield News (note that the modern spelling is 'Pilbara'). Published from 19 February 1897 to 20 March 1923, first in Marble Bar and then, from 1912, in Port Hedland.

Post 1960-

Pilbara Echo
Pilbara Echo.
Karratha & Port Hedland, W.A. : Pilbara Newspapers Pty Ltd.
Dates 	28 Feb. 2008 – 10 Apr. 2014 on. Weekly on Saturday afternoon.
Distribution 14,000 copies free weekly: Port Hedland, South Hedland, Wedgefield, Karratha; Dampier; Wickham, Roebourne, Pt Samson, Onslow, Tom Price, Pannawonnica, Paraburdoo. Shire of Roebourne, Shire of Ashburton & Town of Port Hedland.

North West Times
North West News : a journal of Cliffs Robe River Iron Associates,
Dates – Issue 1 (June 1985) -Biweekly
Published by Robe River Iron Associates from Issue 22 (Apr. 18, 1986)-
Includes Wickham observer vol. 9, no. 21 (Jun. 14, 1985) and Pannawonica news.

Hedland Times
Hedland Times.
Dates – No. 1. 22 June 1967 – 2 Nov. 1978.

Distribution area: Goldsworthy; Marble Bar; Newman; Onslow; Port Hedland; Dampier; Mt Tom Price; Roebourne; Point Samson; Nullagine; Wittenoom; Barrow Island; South Hedland; Cooke Point; Finucane Island; Karratha; Shay Gap; Paraburdoo.

Pilbara Times
Pilbara Times. Also known as The New Pilbara Times
Perth, W.A. – Country Newspapers Pty Ltd.
Dates -	9 Nov. 1978 – vol. 14, no. 171 25 Aug. 1983. Weekly on Thursday.
Distribution: Port Hedland; Wickham; Marble Bar; Onslow; South Hedland; Goldsworthy; Dampier; Telfer; Cooke Point; Finucane Island; Karratha; Newman; Tom Price; Roeburne; Point Samson; Nullagine; Shay Gap; Paraburdoo; Wittenoom; Pannawonica.

Hamersley News
Hamersley News.
Perth, W.A.  Hamersley Iron Pty Ltd. 
Dates – Vol. 1, no. 1. 20 Mar. 1969 – Sep. 1972 –  Monthly	
Vol. 5, no. 1, 26 Oct. 1972 – v. 13, no. 6, 27 Mar. 1980 – Fortnightly.
Distribution: Dampier; Karratha; Tom Price; Paraburdoo.
followed by – Pilbara Advertiser.

Pilbara Advertiser
Pilbara Advertiser.
Karratha W.A. Pilbara Advertiser
Dates – 11 Apr. 1980-24 Aug. 1983. – Weekly on Wednesday.
Fortnightly to 23 May 1980; 
Weekly on Friday from 30 May 1980 to 21 Nov. 1980;
Weekly on Thursday from 27 Nov. 1980 to 28 April 1983; 
Weekly on Wednesday from 4 May 1983.
Distribution: Tom Price; Onslow; Newman; Goldsworthy; Karratha; Dampier; Paraburdoo; Wickham; Roeburne; Port Hedland; South Hedland; Nullagine; Wittenoom; Finucane Island; Marble Bar; Pannawonica; Shay Gap.
followed by – North West Telegraph

North West Telegraph
North West Telegraph.
Albany [W.A.] : Albany Advertiser 	
Dates – 31 Aug. 1983 – Weekly on Wednesday.
Published by Provincial Publications of WA, Rockingham, then by Albany Advertiser, Albany.
From 31 Aug. 1983-6 June 1984 issued in three editions:  Gascoyne edition, Pilbara edition, Kimberley edition.
- combining of  North west telegraph (Pilbara edition), ISSN 0813-961X; and, North west telegraph (Kimberley edition), ISSN 0814-0308.
also at: http://www.westregional.com.au/papers/nwt/index.html
Distribution: Port Hedland; Newman; Marble Bar; Onslow; Tom Price; Goldsworthy; Broome; Meekatharra; Nullagine; Paraburdoo.
Former title – see – The Northern Times – North West Telegraph (Pilbara edition) 0813-961X

Pilbara News
Pilbara News.
Karratha, W.A. : Pilbara News. ISSN 1447-0101
Distribution: Karratha; Dampier; Tom Price; Paraburdoo; Pannawonica; Wickham; Onslow; Gascoyne Junction; Roeburne.

News of the North
News of the North.
Perth W.A.: West Australia Newspapers
Dates 	28 Aug. 1968-15 Jan. 1987. Weekly on Thursday
Supplement to the West Australian.
Weekly on Wednesday from 28 Aug. 1968-2 Mar. 1977;
Weekly on Tuesday from 8 Mar. 1977-8 April 1980;
Weekly on Thursday from 17 April 1980. – 15 Jan 1987.
Distribution: Kalbarri; Denham; Yalgoo; Mt Magnet; Cue; Meekatharra; Sandstone; Laverton; Wiluna; Carnarvon; Wittenoom; Nullagine; Marble Bar; Exmouth; Onslow; Dampier; Tom Price; Mt Newman; Roeburne; Port Hedland; Goldsworthy; Broome; Derby; Cockatoo Island; Koolan Island; Fitzroy Crossing; Hall's Creek; Kununurra; Wyndham.

Source of dates and publication details
State Library of Western Australia website catalogue – https://web.archive.org/web/20180912182347/http://henrietta.liswa.wa.gov.au/

See also
 List of newspapers in Western Australia
 Gascoyne newspapers
 Goldfields-Esperance newspapers
 Great Southern newspapers
 Kimberley newspapers
 Mid West newspapers
 South West newspapers
 Wheatbelt newspapers

References

 
Pilbara newspapers
Pilbara newspapers
Mid West (Western Australia)
Lists of newspapers published in Western Australia